The Ford Royale is an automobile which was produced in Brazil by Autolatina, a joint venture between Ford and Volkswagen, in the 1990s. It was a wagon version of the Ford Versailles sedan.

The Royale was available as a 3-door station wagon and as a 5-door station wagon. 1.8 litre and 2.0 litre four cylinder engines were offered. The Royale and the related Ford Versailles sedan were essentially rebadged Volkswagen Quantums.

References

Royale